Allef Bessa Nunes (born 9 December 1993), known as Allef, is a Brazilian footballer who plays as a defender for Brazilian club Aparecidense.

Club career
Allef made his professional debut in the Segunda Liga for União da Madeira on 9 October 2016 in a game against Cova da Piedade.

References

External links

 

1993 births
Living people
Brazilian footballers
Sportspeople from Mato Grosso do Sul
Association football defenders
Associação Atlética Aparecidense players
Itumbiara Esporte Clube players
Goianésia Esporte Clube players
Grêmio Esportivo Anápolis players
C.F. União players
C.D. Cova da Piedade players
Campeonato Brasileiro Série D players
Liga Portugal 2 players
Brazilian expatriate footballers
Expatriate footballers in Portugal
Brazilian expatriates in Portugal